HAT-P-13b is an extrasolar planet approximately 700 light-years away in the constellation Ursa Major. The planet was discovered when it transited across its sun, HAT-P-13. This planet is a hot Jupiter with 0.851 times the mass of Jupiter and 1.28 radius. The planet has a lower mass, but its overall size is larger than Jupiter.

The study in 2012, utilizing a Rossiter–McLaughlin effect, have determined the planetary orbit is probably aligned with the rotational axis of the star, misalignment equal to 1.9°.

References

External links

Ursa Major (constellation)
Exoplanets discovered by HATNet
Hot Jupiters
Transiting exoplanets
Exoplanets discovered in 2009